Dead Man's Path is the twelfth studio album by American death metal band Malevolent Creation. It was released on October 2, 2015, and their first record to be released on Century Media Records. It is also the final album to feature original vocalist Bret Hoffmann before he left the band the following year and his subsequent death from colon cancer in 2018.

Track listing

Credits and personnel

Malevolent Creation
Brett Hoffmann - vocals
Gio Geraca - lead guitar
Phil Fasciana - rhythm guitar
Jason Blachowicz - bass
Justin DiPinto - drums

Other staff
Julian Hollowell - recording (guitars, bass)
Eliot Geller - recording (drums)
Jim Nickles - recording (vocals)
German Latorres - artwork
Dan Swanö - producer, mixing

References

Malevolent Creation albums
2015 albums
Century Media Records albums
Albums produced by Dan Swanö